Orchard Island is an unincorporated community and residential and tourist area located in Washington and Stokes townships, Logan County, Ohio, United States. Although Orchard Island can only be accessed by road via Russells Point, most addresses on Orchard Island have a Lakeview ZIP Code (43331).

Location
Orchard Island is part of an island chain which encompasses the southeastern shore of Indian Lake, north of Russells Point. Orchard being the largest, neighbor islands include Wolfe, Fox, Willow Bank, and Crystal Beach.

History
At the turn of the 20th century, the island was home for several assemblies of the intellectual Chautauqua movement beginning in 1910. Notable speakers on the variety circuit who visited the island, among entertainers, included William Jennings Bryan. The island was owned by the Orchard Island Improvement Company during this period in which a hotel was maintained before the island was eventually partitioned and sold to private individuals.

Economy
The island is home to several marinas and aquatic recreation establishments. Real estate accounts for a share of the economic activity, with many estates, chalets, and cottages serving as rental property for tourists during the peak summer season.

References

Unincorporated communities in Logan County, Ohio
Unincorporated communities in Ohio